Naveed Alam (16 September 1973 – 13 July 2021) was a Pakistani field hockey player. He competed in the men's tournament at the 1996 Summer Olympics.

On 7 July 2021, it was reported Alam had been diagnosed with blood cancer. He sought financial support from the government for treatment. He died on 13 July 2021, aged 47, after undergoing chemotherapy at Shaukat Khanum Hospital, Lahore.

Playing career 
Naveed Alam mainly played as a fullback and was integral part of the Pakistan Hockey team that clinched the World Cup in Sydney in 1994. He also represented Pakistan in the 1996 Atlanta Olympics.

Post retirement 
Naveed Alam served as the Head Coach of Pakistan’s hockey team at the Beijing Olympic Games in 2008 but soon resigned after finishing 8th - their worst-ever finish in Olympic history. He was appointed as director development and domestic by Pakistan Hockey Federation (PHF) in 2016 but was sacked in 2018 by PHF due to giving statements against the federation. He also coached Bangladesh Hockey team and China Hockey team. In 2020, he was banned for 10 years for forming a parallel association by Punjab Hockey Association. He was also accused of involvement in anti-hockey activities.

References

External links
 

1973 births
2021 deaths
Pakistani male field hockey players
Olympic field hockey players of Pakistan
Field hockey players at the 1996 Summer Olympics
Place of birth missing
Asian Games medalists in field hockey
Asian Games bronze medalists for Pakistan
Medalists at the 1994 Asian Games
Field hockey players at the 1994 Asian Games
Deaths from blood cancer
Deaths from cancer in Pakistan
1998 Men's Hockey World Cup players